The 2006 No Way Out was the eighth No Way Out professional wrestling pay-per-view (PPV) event produced by World Wrestling Entertainment (WWE). It was held exclusively for wrestlers from the promotion's SmackDown! brand division. The event took place on February 19, 2006, at the 1st Mariner Arena in Baltimore, Maryland. The official theme song was "Deadly Game" by Theory of a Deadman.

The main event saw Kurt Angle defend his World Heavyweight Championship against The Undertaker. Angle won the match after reversing a Triangle Choke into a jackknife cover. One of the predominant matches on the card was Randy Orton versus Rey Mysterio for Mysterio's world championship match at WrestleMania 22. Orton won the match with a roll-up while using the ropes for extra leverage. Another primary match on the undercard was Booker T versus Chris Benoit for the WWE United States Championship, which Benoit won after forcing Booker to submit to the Crippler Crossface.

Production

Background
No Way Out was first held by World Wrestling Entertainment (WWE) as the 20th In Your House pay-per-view (PPV) in February 1998. Following the discontinuation of the In Your House series, No Way Out returned in February 2000 as its own PPV event, thus establishing it as the annual February PPV for the promotion. The 2006 event was the eighth event in the No Way Out chronology and was held on February 19 at the 1st Mariner Arena in Baltimore, Maryland. Like the previous two years' events, the 2006 event featured wrestlers exclusively from the SmackDown! brand. The official theme song was "Deadly Game" by Theory of a Deadman.

Storylines
The event featured seven professional wrestling matches with outcomes predetermined by WWE script writers. The matches featured wrestlers portraying their characters in planned storylines that took place before, during and after the event.

The main feud heading into No Way Out was between Kurt Angle and The Undertaker, with the two battling over the World Heavyweight Championship. At the previous pay-per-view, Royal Rumble, Angle defeated Mark Henry to retain the World Heavyweight Championship. When the match was over, Undertaker came out and issued a challenge to Angle for the World Heavyweight Championship. On the February 3 episode of SmackDown!, Angle accepted his offer and the match at No Way Out was made official. The next week on SmackDown!, Undertaker defeated Henry by disqualification after MNM, along with Daivari, came out and attacked Undertaker. After the match, MNM, Henry, and Daivari attacked Undertaker until Angle came out and made the save. SmackDown! General Manager Theodore Long then announced that Undertaker and Angle would face off against Henry and MNM in a 3-on-2 Handicap match next week. On the February 17 episode of SmackDown!, Undertaker and Angle defeated MNM and Henry after Angle forced Johnny Nitro to submit to the Ankle lock.

The other main match on the card was Randy Orton versus Rey Mysterio for Mysterio's world championship match at WrestleMania 22. Their match stemmed from the Royal Rumble. At the Royal Rumble, Mysterio won the 2006 Royal Rumble match and a world championship match at WrestleMania 22 by last eliminating Orton. On the February 3 episode of SmackDown!, Orton claimed that there was no way Mysterio could beat him in a normal match and that he won the match because of some divine intervention. Orton then challenged Mysterio to a match at No Way Out for his title match at WrestleMania 22, and claimed that Eddie Guerrero (Mysterio's friend who had died months prior) was not in heaven, but in hell. Later that night, Orton along with Mark Henry defeated Mysterio and Kurt Angle. Midway through the match, Davari confronted Angle and was chased outside the ring and into the crowd. Henry followed, leaving Mysterio and Orton on their own. Orton gained the pinfall after sitting on Mysterio. After the match, Orton claimed that Mysterio had as much chance of defeating him as Guerrero did of coming back to life. Mysterio responded by accepting Orton's challenge on behalf of Guerrero. The next week on SmackDown!, Orton set the record straight about the comments he made about Guerrero. Backstage, he said that he only made the comments to get inside Mysterio's head, and that he did not know or care if Guerrero was in Hell. Orton later entered the arena in a lowrider to further explain his actions, and read an excerpt from Guerrero's book, Cheating Death, Stealing Life – The Eddie Guerrero Story, but Mysterio attacked him, dropkicking his head into the steel ringpost. On the February 17 episode of SmackDown!, Mysterio faced off against Sylvan, which Mysterio won after a West Coast Pop. After the match, Orton came out and said that Mysterio would never main event WrestleMania, he would never become World Champion and that he could never beat him.

Event

Before the event aired, The Boogeyman defeated Simon Dean in a match taped for Heat.

The first match that aired was a nine-man match for the WWE Cruiserweight Championship in which Gregory Helms defended the title against Brian Kendrick, Funaki, Kid Kash, Nunzio, Paul London, Psicosis, Scotty 2 Hotty and Super Crazy. In the beginning, Helms hid outside the ring but his opponents brought him into the ring and attacked him. Helms received a Sliced Bread #2 from Kendrick, a senton bomb from London and the Worm from Scotty. Psicosis pinned Helms but Kash broke the pin. Kash performed a Dead Level on Psicosis but Super Crazy broke up the pinfall by performing a moonsault. Helms pinned Psicosis to retain the title.

Next was John "Bradshaw" Layfield (JBL) facing Bobby Lashley. Before the match started, Lashley prevented Finlay from attacking Kristal. While Lashley and Finlay fought, JBL made his entrance and took advantage of the situation. Lashley controlled the match but JBL threw him outside the ring and applied a sleeper hold. JBL leapt off the top rope but Lashley caught him with a powerslam. Lashley performed four belly to belly suplexes until Finlay threw Tony Chimel into the ring, distracting the referee. With the referee distracted, Finlay hit Lashley with a shillelagh. JBL took advantage and executed a Clothesline from Hell to win the match.

WWE Tag Team Champions MNM (Joey Mercury and Johnny Nitro) issued an open challenge for a future WWE Tag Team Championship match, which was accepted by Matt Hardy and Tatanka. Tatanka and Hardy controlled the match in the beginning but MNM isolated Hardy for most of the match. Hardy tagged in Tatanka, who chopped MNM. He sent Mercury outside the ring but Melina interfered, allowing Nitro to perform a dropkick on Tatanka off the apron. MNM isolated Tatanka but Tatanka clotheslined Nitro and tagged in Hardy. Hardy attempted a Twist of Fate but Nitro superkicked Hardy. Hardy tagged in Tatanka, who performed a double tomahawk chop on MNM. Tatanka executed a Trail's End on Mercury while Hardy executed a Twist of Fate on Nitro and Tatanka pinned Mercury to win a match for the WWE Tag Team Championship.

The fourth match was for the WWE United States Championship between Booker T and Chris Benoit. Before the match began, Booker announced that he would forfeit the United States title. As Benoit confronted Sharmell, Booker attacked Benoit. Benoit controlled the match in the beginning as he performed a series of suplexes. After Booker told the referee that his groin was re-injured, the referee backed Benoit away but Booker pushed him into the steel steps. Benoit performed a series of German suplexes and paid tribute to Eddie Guerrero by performing the Three Amigos. Booker attempted a Houston Hangover but missed. Benoit executed a series of German suplexes until Sharmell jumped on the apron. Benoit attempted a diving headbutt but Sharmell's distraction allowed Booker to counter. Booker executed a Scissors Kick for a near-fall. Sharmell distracted Benoit again and Booker pinned him with a roll up but Benoit countered into a Sharpshooter attempt, which Booker countered. Benoit avoided a Scissors Kick and applied the Sharpshooter but Booker fought the move. Benoit forced Booker to submit to the Crippler Crossface to win the title.

Next was Rey Mysterio facing Randy Orton with Mysterio's WrestleMania 22 world championship match on the line. Orton controlled the match in the beginning. Mysterio attempted a hurricanrana but Orton caught him and tackled him into the ringpost, injuring his hand. Orton targeted Mysterio's arm and hand. Mysterio executed a hurricanrana but landed on the injured hand. Orton continued to target Mysterio's hand. Orton held Rey in the electric chair but Mysterio countered into a Sunset Flip Powerbomb for a near-fall. Mysterio dropkicked Orton and attempted a 619 but Orton avoided the move and pinned Mysterio with a roll-up using the ropes to win Rey's world title match at WrestleMania.

In the main event, Kurt Angle faced The Undertaker for the World Heavyweight Championship. Undertaker controlled the start of the match, performing Old School and Snake Eyes. Angle performed a German suplex on Undertaker and sent Undertaker into the barricade. Undertaker tackled Angle into the ringpost and dropped a leg on him whilst Angle was on the apron. Undertaker attempted a chokeslam but Angle kicked Undertaker's leg to counter. Angle applied an ankle lock. Undertaker sent Angle outside the ring and attempted another leg drop but Angle countered with an ankle lock. Angle released the hold and applied the ankle lock outside the ring, Angle applied the ankle lock in the ring, which Undertaker countered into a triangle choke. As they fought outside the ring, Angle executed an Angle Slam through a broadcast table. After countering each other's signature moves, Angle executed an Angle Slam for a near-fall. Undertaker applied a Triangle Choke on Angle but Angle countered, rolling up Undertaker to retain the title.

Aftermath
On the March 3 episode of SmackDown!, Kurt Angle defended the World Heavyweight Championship against The Undertaker in a rematch. Undertaker was in control and executed a Tombstone Piledriver on Angle. As Undertaker made the cover, Mark Henry interfered into the match causing a disqualification. Angle was disqualified thus Undertaker won the match but not the title because a title cannot change hands via disqualification. Angle retained the title but Henry started attacking Undertaker. Henry splashed Undertaker through the announcer's table. This led to a casket match between Undertaker and Henry at WrestleMania, which Undertaker won.

Due to Randy Orton defeating Rey Mysterio at No Way Out for Mysterio's world championship title opportunity, SmackDown! General Manager Theodore Long, disgusted by Orton's actions in the match at No Way Out, booked Orton and Mysterio against Kurt Angle in a Triple Threat match for the World Heavyweight Championship, which took place at WrestleMania. Mysterio went on to win the match and the World Heavyweight Championship from Angle after pinning Orton for the win.

Results

References

External links
Official No Way Out 2006 site

2006 in Maryland
Events in Baltimore
2006
Professional wrestling in Baltimore
2006 WWE pay-per-view events
February 2006 events in the United States
WWE SmackDown
es:WWE No Way Out#2006
fr:WWE No Way Out#2006
ru:No Way Out#2006